Franc-Tireur was a French Resistance movement founded at Lyon in November 1940 under the name "France Liberté".  It was renamed "Franc-Tireur" in December 1941 on the proposal of Jean-Jacques Soudeille.

Franc-Tireur was also the name of the movement's clandestine newspaper, which continued publishing issues from December 1941 to 1957 at which point the editorial team had changed several times.

Under the guidance of Jean Moulin, the movement merged with Libération-sud and Combat to form the Mouvements Unis de la Résistance (MUR).

Notable members
 Edouard Alexander
 Georges Altman
 Antoine Avinin
 Marc Bloch
 Eugène Claudius-Petit
 Noël Clavier
 Yves Farge
 André Ferrat
 Jean-Pierre Lévy
 Elie Péju
 Auguste Pinton
 Albert Rohmer
 Henri Romans-Petit
 Jean-Jacques Soudeille

References

See also 
 Clandestine press of the French Resistance

External links 
 Franc Tireur issues online in Gallica, the digital library of the BnF.

French Resistance networks and movements